Michel Albert Roux (born 23 May 1960) previously known as Michel Roux Jr., is an English-French two Michelin starred chef. He owns the London restaurant Le Gavroche.

Early life
Roux was born at Pembury maternity hospital in Kent, whilst his father Albert Roux was working for the horse race trainer Major Peter Cazalet.

Apprenticeship and training
After leaving school at age 16, Roux undertook apprenticeship work with Master Patissier Henri Hellegouarch in Paris. From summer 1979 until January 1980, he worked as a commis de cuisine at Le Gavroche, under both his father and his uncle. He then spent two years as a commis de cuisine trainee under Alain Chapel at his hotel and restaurant in Mionnay, in the Rhône-Alpes region near Lyon.

After undertaking basic training with the French Army, from February 1982 to March 1983 he served his military service at the Élysée Palace, working for both Presidents Valéry Giscard d'Estaing and François Mitterrand. Having finished his military service, Roux then worked for four months in Paris: two months at Charcuterie Gérard Mothu in St-Mandé; and then two months at Boucherie Lamartine on the Avenue Victor-Hugo.

Career
Having served his apprenticeship and training mainly away from the Roux brothers' British business empire, he joined his uncle at the Waterside Inn, in Bray, Berkshire in 1985, before working with his father at Le Gavroche from the April of the same year. He then worked in and managed the Roux brothers catering business for three years, before returning to Le Gavroche in 1990, the year the two brothers split their business down family lines. When his father retired in 1993, Michel Jr took over the world-famous restaurant.

A food consultant to the Walbrook club since 2003, he also consults for the fine dining providers Restaurant Associates. Roux has also written several books, including Le Gavroche Cookbook; The Marathon Chef; and Matching Food and Wine, which was named the best book on matching wine and food at the Gourmand World Cookbook Awards.

Media
Roux has made various television appearances, including on his friend Gordon Ramsay's ITV produced Hell's Kitchen, and as an expert judge on the BBC Two programme MasterChef: The Professionals (2008–13). In 2012 he appeared as a guest judge on Masterchef South Africa. From 2013 until 2014, Roux co-presented BBC Two's Food and Drink alongside Kate Goodman. In 2013, he appeared as one of the mentors in the series The Chef's Protege.

In March 2014, Roux announced that he was leaving the BBC due to a conflict over his brand ambassadorship for Albert Bartlett Rooster potatoes. 
In 2015, Roux returned to television and presented First Class Chefs for the Disney Channel and Kitchen Impossible with Michel Roux Jr for Channel 4.

In April 2016 Roux stepped in as presenter on BBC's Saturday Kitchen after the departure of James Martin who left after 10 years. Roux ruled himself out of becoming a full-time host.

Controversies

In November 2016, the Guardian reported that whilst Roux's restaurant made over £250,000 in profit in 2015, he was paying some of his chefs less than the minimum wage. A chef showed the Guardian journalist Robert Booth evidence that chefs typically put in over 65 hours of labour per week, only earning about £5.50 per hour. Work days began at 7am ending at 11.30pm, with only one hour break between lunch and dinner times, and sometimes as little as fifteen minutes for meal times.

Booth's Guardian article noted that in response to the exposé, "Roux said ... he was 'embarrassed and sorry' after the Guardian revealed he was paying chefs as little as £5.50 per hour when they were working 68 hours per week."

In late-2016, it was revealed that Roux was keeping servers' tips and service charge. In light of this, he vowed to "scrap tips and service charge", instead including them in the cost of a meal. This has garnered backlash from customers and critics alike, as it leaves the customer with no viable way of choosing how much to tip, and encourages the inference that the optional service charge is now mandatory.

Personal life
Roux is married to Giselle, who has worked in the restaurant business for many years and is the secretary at Le Gavroche. The couple have a daughter, Emily, who is also a chef. The Roux family lives in London.

Roux is a rugby fan and an honorary member of Harlequins and attends most matches. He also likes Manchester United and Wigan Warriors, and is a keen marathon runner, having run the London marathon twelve times to raise funds for the children's charity Visually Impaired Children Taking Action.

Publications
 Le Gavroche Cookbook (2001), London: W&N (Orion), 
 The Marathon Chef: Food for Getting Fit (2003), London: W&N (Orion), 
 Le Gavroche Cookbook: Ten Recipes from One of the World's Great Restaurants (2005), London: Phoenix, 
 Matching Food And Wine: Classic And Not So Classic Combinations (2005), London: W&N (Orion), 
 Michel Roux: A Life in the Kitchen (2009), London: W&N (Orion), 
 Cooking with The Master Chef: Food For Your Family & Friends (2010), London: W&N (Orion), 
 The French Kitchen: 200 Recipes From the Master of French Cooking (2013), London: W&N (Orion), 
 Le Gavroche Cookbook (2017), London: W&N (Orion), 
 Les Abats (2017), London: W&N (Orion), 
 The French Revolution: 140 Classic Recipes made Fresh & Simple (2018), (Seven Dials),

References

External links

Michel Roux's personal website
Michel Roux's 2nd London Restaurant

1960 births
Living people
People from Pembury
English people of French descent
French Army officers
English chefs
Head chefs of Michelin starred restaurants
British broadcasters
BBC television presenters
English television chefs
British cookbook writers
British food writers
Roux family